A Sight for Sore Eyes is a 2005 dramatic short film directed by Shane Stanley and starring Hayden Adams, Deborah Zoe, and Gary Busey. The screenplay concerns a man who is reunited with a former high school flame who is now blind.

Plot 
An overconfident young executive with a matching ego thinks he's a know-it-all with the ladies until he's reunited with Amie; his former high school flame who is now blind. The encounter causes him to rethink his relationships with everyone from the women he dates to his father, whom he hasn't seen in several years.

Cast
 Hayden Adams - Steve Langston
 Deborah Zoe - Amy Cooper
 Gary Busey - Earl Cooper
 Rhasaan Orange - Jarred Williams
 Alisa Reyes - Laura Sanchez
 Terry Holbrook - Jan Cooper
 Marla Maples - Samantha Blake
 Val Barri - Marie Evans
 Keith MacKechnie - Howard van Bommel
 Zack Duhame  - Ryan Cooper
 Kelly M. Dixon - Traci Lewis

Awards and honors
In 2005, A Sight for Sore Eyes was honored with the Gold Special Jury Award at WorldFest-Houston International Film Festival before winning three Aurora Awards for writing, original screenplay and directing. The film was honored with two Telly Awards for writing and directing and won several renown international film festivals including the International Film Festival for best dramatic short film. The film was invited to screen at the Cannes Film Festival in 2005.

External links
 

2005 short films
2005 films
American short films
2000s English-language films